Michele Caccavale (13 July 1947 –  2 January 2019) was an Italian politician who served as a Deputy between 1994 and 1996.

References

1947 births
2019 deaths
Italian politicians